The Opportunists (French: Les arrivistes, German: Trübe Wasser) is a 1960 French-East German drama film directed by Louis Daquin and starring Madeleine Robinson, Jean-Claude Pascal and Clara Gansard. It was a co-production between Pathé and DEFA. The source material is Honoré de Balzac's novel La Rabouilleuse.

Cast

References

Bibliography 
 Goble, Alan. The Complete Index to Literary Sources in Film. Walter de Gruyter, 1999.

External links 
 

1960 films
1960 drama films
French drama films
German drama films
East German films
1960s French-language films
Films directed by Louis Daquin
Films based on works by Honoré de Balzac
Films based on French novels
Films set in the 1820s
1960s French films
1960s German films